Alexander Alexandrovich Vasiliev ((born December 8, 1958, Moscow) is a Russian fashion historian, collector and TV host. He is an honorary member of the Russian Academy of Arts and founder of the international interior prize.

References

External links 
 Alexander Vasilyev  Foundation

1958 births
Living people
Writers from Moscow
Russian collectors
Russian television presenters
Chevaliers of the Ordre des Arts et des Lettres
Honorary Members of the Russian Academy of Arts
21st-century Russian historians
Fashion historians
Moscow Art Theatre School alumni